is a Japanese manga series written and illustrated by Minetarō Mochizuki. It was serialized in Kodansha's seinen manga magazine Weekly Young Magazine from 1985 to 1988. A live-action film adaptation, directed by Joji Matsuoka, premiered in June 1990.

Media

Manga
Written and illustrated by Minetarō Mochizuki, Bataashi Kingyo was serialized in Kodansha's seinen manga magazine Weekly Young Magazine from 1985 to 1988. Kodansha collected its chapters in six tankōbon volumes, released from May 15, 1986, to September 12, 1988.

Live-action film

Reception
The film was chosen as the third-best film at the 12th Yokohama Film Festival. Joji Matsuoka won the Award for Best New Director, Saki Takaoka won the award for Best Newcomer and Norimichi Kasamatsu won the award for Best Cinematography.

References

External links
 
 

1990 directorial debut films
1990s Japanese films
1990s Japanese-language films
Films directed by Joji Matsuoka
Live-action films based on manga
Manga adapted into films
Seinen manga
Swimming in anime and manga